Irtiza Rubab (born 12 May 1977), better known by her stage name Meera, is a Pakistani film actress and television presenter. She has appeared in Urdu, Punjabi and Hindi movies.

Career
Meera made her movie debut in 1995, and earned nationwide critical acclaim in 1999 for her lead performance in Khilona (1996–97). She won her first Nigar Award for her acting in Khilona, and received significant praise for her work. With the release of Inteha, another critical and commercial success, she won the second consecutive Nigar Award for Best Actress of the year for her break-out performance. During the late 1990s, she became an integral part of Lollywood. In 2004, she played a prominent role in Salakhain which lifted her image internationally. In 2005, she acted in a joint Indo-Pakistani film, Nazar with which she debuted in Bollywood. In 2010, she played the titular role of Husan Ara in TV One's Husan Ara Kaun, followed by another role in A-Plus TV's drama Bichday Toh Ahsaas Hua in next year. In 2014, she was honoured with Best Actress Award at 3rd Delhi International Film Festival, for her ''out of the box'' performance in psychological thriller film Hotal. In 2016, she announced her first project as a director, which was titled Oscar. Same year she played a popular role of Naseem Dilruba for TV One in the drama Mein Sitara, Which was nominated for Lux Style Awards. In addition, she played a key character in the television series Naagin. She appeared as a film star in the 2019 drama film Baaji, which proved to be a box office success. In 2019 she performed in a PTV Home's drama named Abba which is still very popular.

She has announced to enter politics and that she will join Pakistan Tehreek-e-Insaaf (PTI), the party in power in Pakistan.

Bollywood career 
Meera did her first movie in India, named Nazar which had her as the first Pakistani actress to be seen in India like Begum Para, as well as it was the beginning of the India Pakistan peace talks. Nazar was a film directed by Soni Razdan and it was the first Indo-Pakistani joint movie venture in 50 years. Her second movie was Kasak starring Lucky Ali. Although Kasak failed critically and commercially, Meera still kept working in Bollywood. Her third film Paanch Ghantey Mien Paanch Crore was an average grosser at the box office. The film was not screened for press and critics as the director Faisal Saif wanted to show the film directly to the audience. The film managed a decent opening of 50% with its limited cinema release. However, The Times of India listed the film in Bollywood's Top 10 Bold Films category of 2012.

In 2015, she performed an item song in another Indian film Bumpe RFr Draw.

Personal life
In 2009, a Faisalabad-based businessman Sheikh Attiq-ur-Rehman claimed that he and Meera were married in 2007. Meera denied that marriage and filed a case against him for making a false claim. But in 2018, a Lahore family court declared Meera to be the wife of Attiq-ur-Rehman by validating the marriage certificate and honeymoon pictures.

Filmography

Television

Awards and recognition

See also
 List of Pakistani actresses
 Veena Malik
 Mathira
 Rabi Pirzada

References

External links

Living people
1977 births
Actresses from Lahore
Actresses in Urdu cinema
Actresses in Punjabi cinema
Actresses in Hindi cinema
Kinnaird College for Women University alumni
Nigar Award winners
Pakistani film actresses
Pakistani television actresses
Pakistani expatriate actresses in India
Recipients of the Pride of Performance
20th-century Pakistani actresses
21st-century Pakistani actresses
People from Lahore